Inha University in Tashkent or IUT (Toshkent Shahridagi Inha Universiteti in Uzbek) is a branch of Korean Inha University in Tashkent, Uzbekistan. Inha University in Tashkent has two departments - School of Computer and Information Engineering, and School of Logistics.

Inha University in Tashkent was established according to the resolution of the first president of the Republic of Uzbekistan. IUT is the result of the cooperation between Inha University of Korea and the government of Uzbekistan with the goal of developing IT leaders. Inha University in Korea is oriented toward engineering, IT, management, logistics, etc. The curriculum and academic program for Inha University in Tashkent is similar to that of its Korean counterpart.

Campus

The campus is based in Tashkent city. There is one main building with seven floors. And another new building with 3 floors, which holds the conference hall.

Schools

School of Computer and Information Engineering (SOCIE) 
 School of Logistics and Business Administration (SOL)

Facilities

The Information Resource Center

The Information Resource Centre is equipped with the computers that run Microsoft Office Professional (Word, Excel, PowerPoint), Internet Explorer to access the Internet and e-mail, and software required to support the curriculum.

Books, theses, reports, journals, magazines, reference works and non-print materials are included in the holdings of the centre. With ID cards, students can use the printing, scanning and photocopying services.

The Information Resource Centre is located on the 1st floor, room 103.

PC labs

There are three main PC labs for use by IUT students. The total number of PCs is 150. The main objective of the PC lab is to learn fundamental concepts of object-oriented programming and to practice them with C++.

Physics Lab

The objective of the physics lab is to understand the basics of classical mechanics and thermal/statistical physics.

Data Center
The Data Center enables staff and students access to university data and information services.

Innovations and Industry Cooperation Center
In January, 2016 the IUT established Innovations and Industry Cooperation Center (IICC) with the aim of supporting  research and innovation, strengthening of conditions for professional skills development of students, and technology transfer, as well as incubation of startups. IICC has established IUTLab, where undergraduate students can engage in web and mobile development and provide various IT-services to customers.

Vision Center

Owing to the fact that IUT maintains open doors policy and visitors can enter premises freely, several companies have established information stands in the lobby of the main building of IUT. This gives a chance for companies to present their latest technologies to the wider public. Samsung, KT, and SAP have already established their permanent exhibition stands in the Vision Center, while Microsoft, Hanjin Group, and Korean Air are currently preparing them for initiation.   
Samsung Smart Class includes application location, curriculum planning, learning management systems and mapping question banks on a tablet.
Also, the stand includes the multi-display videowall solution and interactive e-board.

See also

TEAM University
Inha University
Turin Polytechnic University in Tashkent
Tashkent State Technical University
Tashkent Institute of Irrigation and Melioration
Tashkent Financial Institute
Moscow State University in Tashkent named M.V Lomonosov
Tashkent Automobile and Road Construction Institute
Tashkent State University of Economics
Tashkent State Agrarian University
Tashkent State University of Law
Tashkent University of Information Technologies
University of World Economy and Diplomacy
Westminster International University in Tashkent
Yeoju Technical Institute in Tashkent

References

Universities in Uzbekistan
Education in Tashkent
Educational institutions established in 2014
2014 establishments in Uzbekistan
Inha University